Symphony No. 33 may refer to:

 Symphony No. 33 (Haydn)
 Symphony No. 33 (Michael Haydn)
 Symphony No. 33 (Mozart)

033